Walnut Grove is a census-designated place (CDP) in Clark County, Washington, United States. The population was 9,790 at the 2010 census, up from 7,164 at the 2000 census.

Based on per capita income, one of the more reliable measures of affluence, Walnut Grove ranks 78th out of 522 areas in the state of Washington to be ranked.

Geography
Walnut Grove is located in southern Clark County at  (45.674272, -122.601267). It is bordered by the city of Vancouver to the southeast and west, and by the suburbs of Minnehaha to the south, Hazel Dell to the west, Salmon Creek to the northwest, Barberton to the north, and Five Corners to the east.

Demographics

As of the census of 2000, there were 7,164 people, 2,737 households, and 2,003 families residing in the CDP. The population density was 1,891.3 people per square mile (729.8/km2). There were 2,848 housing units at an average density of 751.9/sq mi (290.1/km2). The racial makeup of the CDP was 90.75% White, 1.12% African American, 0.80% Native American, 3.14% Asian, 0.47% Pacific Islander, 1.19% from other races, and 2.54% from two or more races. Hispanic or Latino of any race were 2.96% of the population. 17.2% were of German, 10.8% English, 10.6% American, 10.0% Irish and 5.4% Norwegian ancestry according to Census 2000.

There were 2,737 households, out of which 33.4% had children under the age of 18 living with them, 59.2% were married couples living together, 8.8% had a female householder with no husband present, and 26.8% were non-families. 20.1% of all households were made up of individuals, and 6.2% had someone living alone who was 65 years of age or older. The average household size was 2.61 and the average family size was 3.00.

In the CDP, the age distribution of the population shows 25.9% under the age of 18, 7.5% from 18 to 24, 30.6% from 25 to 44, 24.8% from 45 to 64, and 11.2% who were 65 years of age or older. The median age was 37 years. For every 100 females, there were 98.4 males. For every 100 females age 18 and over, there were 97.2 males.

The median income for a household in the CDP was $52,788, and the median income for a family was $56,125. Males had a median income of $45,752 versus $31,956 for females. The per capita income for the CDP was $25,747. About 3.8% of families and 6.1% of the population were below the poverty line, including 5.6% of those under age 18 and 4.6% of those age 65 or over.

References

Census-designated places in Clark County, Washington
Census-designated places in Washington (state)
Portland metropolitan area